Edwin Anderson may refer to:

Edwin Anderson, Jr. (1860–1933), United States Navy officer
Edwin Maffitt Anderson (1843–1923), Confederate naval officer
Edwin Anderson (sport shooter) (1886–1943), American Olympic sport shooter
Edwin H. Anderson (1861–1947), American library leader
Edwin J. Anderson (1902–1987), American sports executive